This article features the discography of Kosovo-Albanian singer and songwriter Dafina Zeqiri. Her discography includes two studio albums, one extended play and numerous singles as a lead artist and featured artist.

Albums

Studio albums

Extended plays 
 King EP (2017)

Singles

As lead artist

As featured artist

Notes

References 

Discographies of Albanian artists